The BLH AS-616 was a  C-C diesel-electric locomotive built by Baldwin-Lima-Hamilton between 1950 and 1954. Nineteen railroads bought 214 locomotives, and two railroads bought seven cabless B units. The AS-616 was valued for its extremely high tractive effort, far more than any comparable ALCo or EMD product. It was used in much the same manner as its four-axle counterpart, the AS-16, and its six-axle sister, the AS-416, though the six-traction motor design allowed better tractive effort at lower speeds.

Original owners

Design
The AS-616 was very similar to the previous model, the Baldwin DRS-6-6-1500, riding on the same basic frame and sharing the same body. The design was very simple, lacking the 1950s styling of the competing EMD F3 and ALCO FA. The utilitarian design was valued for switching jobs, a position the AS-616 filled easily.

The AS-616 would be the company's best selling road switcher of all time, and the builder's third greatest selling diesel electric model of all time.

Redesign
In 1954, BLH (believing the utilitarian design of their road switchers was the cause of their overall failure on the market) redesigned their entire roster of locomotives, with all gaining new abilities. The most notable effect of the redesign was the raising of the roof on all their road switchers, causing the roof to take the shape of a triangular prism. Only a few units were sold with this design, as failing sales had dropped to their lowest at the time. BLH began offering dynamic braking on all road switchers, though the AS-616 was already offered with optional dynamic brakes.

Usage
Despite being marketed as a road switcher (like the EMD SD9 and ALCO RSD-4 of the same time period), the AS-616 saw most use as a heavy switcher. The impressive tractive effort and GSC rigid bolster trimount trucks appealed to roads with heavy hump yards (such as Southern Pacific). Ultimately, while many saw road service, the AS-616 was a switcher that was far ahead of its time.

BLH offered more options on the AS-616 in comparison to the DRS-6-6-1500, with some units gaining boilers, and others gaining dynamic braking. BLH also offered Multiple-unit train control on the AS-616, though  many roads bought the unit purely for switching, opting out of MU. Some units that lacked MU were given MU by the parent company (or by an associate) depending on the road's preference.

By the 1970s almost all AS-616s had been scrapped or sold. A select few railroads-Trona Railway being a major operator- kept their diesels running far past their builder's lifetime.

Preservation
Nine AS-616 diesels are preserved.
 Oregon and Northwestern Railroad #1, former Baldwin-Lima-Hamilton demonstrator #1601
 Trona Railway #52, at SMS Rail Lines as part of a former Trona Railway collection
 Southern Pacific #5250, in Jamaica
 Southern Pacific #5253, at Western Pacific Railroad Museum as Oregon & Northwestern #4
 Southern Pacific #5274, at Western Pacific Railroad Museum as Oregon & Northwestern #3
 Southern Pacific #5249, at SMS Rail Lines as part of a former Trona Railway collection
 Kaiser Steel #1012A, reportedly still with Kaiser Bauxite of Jamaica
 Kaiser Steel #1012B, at SMS Rail Lines, operational
 Estrada de Ferro Central do Brasil #3380

References

AS-616
C-C locomotives
Diesel-electric locomotives of the United States
Railway locomotives introduced in 1950
Locomotives with cabless variants
Standard gauge locomotives of the United States
5 ft 3 in gauge locomotives
Metre gauge diesel locomotives
Standard gauge locomotives of Mexico
Diesel-electric locomotives of Mexico